Frangipani (Sayapethi Kusuma) is a 2016 Sri Lankan Sinhala romantic drama film directed and co-produced by Sunil T. Fernando for Sunil T Films and Visakesa Chandrasekaram for Havelock Arts. It stars Dasun Pathirana, Jehan Sri Kanth and Yasodha Rasanduni in lead roles. Music composed by Shantha Pieris. It is the 1260th Sri Lankan film in the Sinhala cinema.

Plot
The film discussed about a new pathway of Sri Lankan society, where a heterosexual woman married a gay man, and breaks the relationship of his bisexual friend.

Cast
 Dasun Pathirana as Chamath 
 Jehan Sri Kanth Appuhamy as Nalin
 Yasodha Rasanduni as Sarasi
 Ruwan Malith as Monk Sobhitha
 Kumudu Kumarasinghe as Sarasi's mother
 Ganga Jeewani Waliwatte as Chamath's mother
 Anjana Premaratne as Chamath's brother
 Nishantha Lawrence as Chamath's father
 Nilmini Buwaneka as Teacher
 Bhoomi Harendran as Shehan/Shehani

Acclaim
It was screened at numerous international film festivals including the Mumbai Queer Film Festival, but has only been shown in two venues in Sri Lanka, where homosexuality is illegal.

The film is Chandrasekaram's feature-length debut. He said in an interview with Fridae that "The film is typical in many ways of the experience of LGBT in Sri Lanka, typical of the experience that I myself had.”

Soundtrack

Awards and nominations

References

2016 films
Sinhala-language films